Addisonia excentrica is a species of sea snail, a marine gastropod mollusk in the family Addisoniidae.

Distribution
This species can be found in European waters and in the Mediterranean Sea.

Description 
The maximum recorded shell length is 20.3 mm. The size of the ovate shell varies between 8 mm and 20 mm. It is thin and whitish. The apex presents an appearance as if an embryonic tip (perhaps spiral) had fallen and been replaced by a peculiarly blunt ovate apex, which in the young shell is nearly marginal, posterior and to the left of the middle line, but in the adult is considerably within the margin, curved downward and backward and much more asymmetrical. The sculpture of the shell shows faint grooves radiating from the (smooth) apex and reticulated by the stronger concentric lines of growth, beside which the extremely inflated arch of the back is somewhat obscurely concentrically waved. The shell has a polished appearance over the sculpture. The thin margins are sharp. The interior of the shell is smooth and somewhat polished. The scar of the pedal muscle is narrow and at a considerable distance within the margin. The anterior ends of the scar are enlarged and hooked backward on their inner edges. These ends are connected by a line broadly arched forward and marking the attachments of the mantle to the shell over the head.

Habitat 
Minimum recorded depth is 91 m. Maximum recorded depth is 1170 m.

References

 McLean, J. H. 1985. The Archaeogastropod family Addisoniidae Dall 1882: Life habit and review of species. Veliger 28: 99–108
 Rosenberg, G. 1992. Encyclopedia of Seashells. Dorset: New York. 224 pp. page(s): 31
 Dantart L. & Luque A. A. (1994). Cocculiniformia and Lepetidae (Gastropoda: Archaeogastropoda) from Iberian waters. Journal of Molluscan Studies 60 (3): 277-313
 Turgeon, D.D., et al. 1998. Common and scientific names of aquatic invertebrates of the United States and Canada. American Fisheries Society Special Publication 26-page(s): 59 
 Gofas, S.; Le Renard, J.; Bouchet, P. (2001). Mollusca, in: Costello, M.J. et al. (Ed.) (2001). European register of marine species: a check-list of the marine species in Europe and a bibliography of guides to their identification. Collection Patrimoines Naturels, 50: pp. 180–213
 Roldan E. & Luque A. (2010) The ecology, biology and taxonomy of Addisonia excentrica (Tiberi, 1855) (Cocculiniformia: Addisoniidae) from southern Spain. Journal of Molluscan Studies 76:201–210

External links
  Serge GOFAS, Ángel A. LUQUE, Joan Daniel OLIVER,José TEMPLADO & Alberto SERRA (2021) - The Mollusca of Galicia Bank (NE Atlantic Ocean); European Journal of Taxonomy 785: 1–114
 

Addisoniidae
Gastropods described in 1855